The Jawaharlal Nehru Auto Nagar Industrial Estate (also known as, Autonagar and Jawahar Autonagar) is an Industrial estate located in eastern side of Vijayawada in the Indian state of Andhra Pradesh. The Jawahar Autonagar is first  largest auto industry hubs of Asia. It is also the first Autonagar of the state. It was established in 1966 and has completed 50 years of existence in the year 2016.

Transport
APSRTC City Bus Routes

References 

Industrial parks in India
Economy of Vijayawada
Monuments and memorials to Jawaharlal Nehru
Automotive industry in India